George Thomas Basden  (31 October 1873 – 30 December 1944) was  Archdeacon of the Niger from 1926 until 1936.

He was educated at the CMS College, Islington and Durham University. He was ordained in 1901 and was at Onitsha from 1902 until 1908. He was the Principal at Awka from 1908 until 1926 before his appointment as Archdeacon; and Rector of Jevington afterwards.

Photographs by G.T. Basden 

Basden published two books of ethnography on the Igbo people of Nigeria:

References

1873 births
1944 deaths
Archdeacons of the Niger
Fellows of the Royal Geographical Society
Alumni of University College, Durham
Officers of the Order of the British Empire
Alumni of the Church Missionary Society College, Islington
People from Willingdon
20th-century Nigerian Anglican priests